Ahmad Maher Abul Samen (born 1957) is the Jordanian Minister of Public Works and Housing and Minister of Transport. He was appointed as minister on 27 October 2022.

Education 
Samen holds a Bachelor of Architecture from the University of Bucharest.

References 

1957 births
21st-century Jordanian politicians
Government ministers of Jordan
Living people
Public works ministers of Jordan